is a Japanese actress and model.

Biography
Takei was born in Nagoya. Aspiring to become a model, she declared to her parents on her entry to junior high school that she would become a model within three years. In 2006, she entered the 11th Japan Bishōjo Contest and won in not only one, but two categories: she received the Model Division Award and the Multi-Media Award.

She subsequently made her model debut in the November 2006 issue of Seventeen, which became her first job in the entertainment industry. In February 2007, she became a model exclusive to the magazine, and earned her first solo cover on the 15 February issue.

Starting in September 2010, she became the image character for "Beamie", an SNS website used by approximately 5,500 celebrities. In November the same year, she was the youngest ever in history to receive the "Best Dresser Award", an award from The Men's Fashion Unity since 1972.

In January 2011, she had her first appearance in the Fuji TV drama serial Taisetsu na Koto wa Subete Kimi ga Oshiete Kureta. She was picked by winning an audition in which eight hundred people attended to play a key person in a quasi-leading role in the drama. Soon after, she had her first starring role in TV Asahi drama serial Asuko March! in April.

She won the "Best Smile of the Year" award in November, and in December became the first Japanese person to be contracted with Italian luxury goods brand Gucci.

On 12 December 2011, she made her debut as a singer under Universal Japan, releasing the single "Koisuru Kimochi". The ballad was written for her by Glay's Takuro who declared himself as a big fan of Takei.

In August 2012, she graduated from being a Seventeen model after 5 years and 9 months.

Appearances

TV dramas
Otomen ~Summer~ (2009), Kuriko Tachibana
Otomen ~Autumn~ (2009), Kuriko Tachibana
Liar Game 2 (2010), Hiroka Saeki
Gold (2010), Akira Saotome
Taisetsu na Koto wa Subete Kimi ga Oshiete Kureta (2011), Hikari Saeki
Asukō March! ~Kenritsu Asuka Kōgyō Kōkō Kōshinkyoku~ (2011), Nao Yoshino
Honto ni Atta Kowai Hanashi Summer Special 2011 (2011), Kyoka Koyama
Taira no Kiyomori Episode 14 - 43 (2012), Tokiwa Gozen
W no Higeki (2012), Mako Watsuji/Satsuki Kurasawa
Iki mo Dekinai Natsu (2012), Rei Tanizaki
Flat Out Tokyo Girl (2012), Urara Saeki
Otenki Oneesan (2013), Haruko Abe
Kindaichi Kōsuke VS Akechi Kogorō (2013), Hatsue Yoshiike
The Partner (2013), Akane Oiwa
Umi no Ue no Shinryōjo (2013), Mako Togami
Senryokugai Sōsakan (2014), Chinami Umidzuki
Zero no Shinjitsu ~Kansatsui Matsumoto Mao~ (2014), Mao Matsumoto
The Perfect Insider (2014), Moe Nishinosono
Age Harassment (2015), Emiri Yoshii
Seisei Suruhodo, Aishiteru (2016), Mia Kurihara
Fragile (2016), Chihiro Miyazaki
Setouchi Shonen Yakyu dan (2016), Komako Nakai
Black Leather Notebook (2017), Motoko Haraguchi
Ima kara Anata wo Kyouhaku Shimasu (2017)

Movies
The Cherry Orchard: Blossoming (2008), Maki Mizuta
For Love's Sake (2012), Ai Saotome
Rurouni Kenshin (2012), Kamiya Kaoru
Love for Beginners (2012), Tsubaki Hibino
Rurouni Kenshin: Kyoto Inferno (2014), Kamiya Kaoru
Rurouni Kenshin: The Legend Ends (2014), Kamiya Kaoru
Clover (2014), Saya Suzuki
Terra Formars (2016), Nanao Akita
Rurouni Kenshin: The Final (2021), Kamiya Kaoru

TV programs
 Unbelievable (April 2010-February 2011)
 K-Pop & Korean Dramas...Star ga Umareru Bashō ~Takei Emi and Youn-a Hanryū Roots e no Tabi~ (2011)
 Takei Emi 19sai no Kyūjitsu - Kankoku Hitori Tabi ~Micchaku! Sugao ni Modotta Mikakan~ (2013)

Radio
 Emi Takei and Rikao Yanagida's Radio Kūsō Kagaku Kenkyūsho (2010–present)
 Daiichi Seimei Takei Emi "Kyō no Ikku" (2012–present)

Voice acting
Fast Five (2011), Elena Neves (Japanese dubbing)
Doctor Lautrec and the Forgotten Knights (2011), Sophie Coubertin (Japanese release)
Binary Domain (2012) - Yuki (Japanese release)
Crayon Shin-chan: Serious Battle! Robot Dad Strikes Back (2014)
Dragon Quest Heroes II (2016), Teresia
Nioh (2017), Okatsu

Commercials
 Yokohama Hakkeijima Sea Paradise Petting Lagoon (2007)
 Takara Tomy Hi-kara (2008)
 Shiseido
 Tsubaki Water (2010)
 Maquillage (2011–present)
 Lotte
 Ghana Milk Chocolate (2011–present)
 Ghana Chocolate & Cookie Sandwich (2011-2012)
 Fruitio (2012–present)
 Fit's Link & Fruitio x Movie Rurouni Kenshin Tie-up Campaign (2012)
 SoftBank Mobile (2011)
 Coca-Cola Japan Sokenbicha (2011)
 ÆON (2011–present)
 MaxValu (2012–present)
 Nintendo "Rhythm Heaven Fever" (2011)
 Nissin Spa King (2011–present)
 Fast Five Movie (2011)
 NEC Personal Computer (2011–present)
 Sekisui Chemical Company Sekisui Heim (2011–present)
 Aoyama Trading Yōfuku no Aoyama (2011–present)
 Daiichi Seimei (2011–present)
 J Sports (2011–present)
 Tokyo Metro (2012–present)
 Tokyo Metropolitan Art Museum Mauritshuis Museum Exhibition (2012)
 JTB (2012–present)
 GREE Tsuri Star (2012–present)
 House Foods Toast Seasoning (2012–present)
 Seiko Lukia (2012–present)
 Mobcast Mobile Pro/Mobile Soccer (2013–present)
 Japanese Red Cross Society Hatachi no Kenketsu (2014–present)
 SSP Alesion 10 (2014–present)

Magazines
 Seventeen (February 2007-October 2012)- Exclusive model

Photobooks
 Kaze no Naka no Shōjo (Wani Books, 28 October 2010) 
 Plumeria (Spirits Special Edition) (Shogakukan, 20 June 2011) 
 Emi Takei Photobook Bloom (Kadokawa Shoten, 6 June 2015)

Discography

Singles

Awards and recognitions
2006
11th Japan Bishōjo Contest Model Division Award and Multi-Media Award

2011
68th Television Academy Awards - Best Supporting Actress for "Taisetsu na Koto wa Subete Kimi ga Oshiete Kureta"
Vogue Japan Women of the Year 2011 Award

2012
2012 E-Line Beautiful Grand Prix (Japan Association of Adult Orthodontics)
24th Yamaji Fumiko Film Awards - Best New Actress Award
25th Nikkan Sports Film Award - Best Newcomer Award
54th FECJ Awards - Celebrity of the Year Award

2013
37th Elan d'or Awards - Best Newcomer Award
36th Japan Academy Film Prize - Best New Actor Award for "Rurouni Kenshin", "Ai to Makoto", "Kyō, Koi o Hajimemasu"
22nd Japanese Film Critics Awards - Best New Actress Award for "Kyō, Koi o Hajimemasu"
18th Vietnam Film Festival - Best Actress for "The Partner"

2015
Japan Action Award 2015 - Best Action Actress for Rurouni Kenshin: Kyoto Inferno

References

External links

Emi Takei official Website
Emi Takei on Universal Music Japan

1993 births
Living people
Japanese women singers
Japanese film actresses
Japanese television actresses
Japanese television personalities
Japanese video game actresses
Japanese voice actresses
21st-century Japanese actresses
Japanese female models
People from Nagoya
Universal Music Japan artists